Lesbian, gay, bisexual and transgender (LGBT) people in the British Overseas Territory of the Pitcairn Islands enjoy most of the same rights as non-LGBT people. Same-sex sexual activity is legal, discrimination based on sexual orientation is constitutionally outlawed and same-sex marriage has been legal since 14 May 2015.

Legality of same-sex sexual activity
Same-sex sexual activity has been legal in the Pitcairn Islands since 2001.

Recognition of same-sex partnerships

Same-sex marriage became legal in the Pitcairn Islands on 14 May 2015; however, none of the c. 50 Pitcairn Islanders currently residing in the territory is known to be in a same-sex relationship. An ordinance to legalise such marriages was unanimously approved by the Island Council on 1 April 2015, and was signed by Governor Jonathan Sinclair on 5 May. It was published on 13 May 2015. The law, known as the Same Sex Marriage and Civil Partnerships Ordinance 2015, also provides for the recognition of a registered civil partnership performed outside of Pitcairn. The move to legalise same-sex marriage was widely published on international media. Deputy Governor Kevin Lynch said that the change had been suggested by British authorities. A local resident said the law "wasn't even a major point of discussion until the outside world began catching up on the news".

Discrimination protections
The Pitcairn Islands Constitution Order 2010 bans discrimination on the basis of sexual orientation, among other categories, reading:
[T]he expression "discriminatory" means affording different treatment to different persons on any ground such as sex, sexual orientation, race, colour, language, religion, age, disability, political or other opinion, national or social origin, association with a national minority, property, birth or other status.

The term "gender identity" is mentioned only twice in Pitcairn law. Firstly, the Marriage Ordinance states that "'marriage' means the union of two people regardless of their sex, sexual orientation or gender identity". Secondly, the Sentencing Ordinance requires courts to take into account certain individual factors when dealing with an offender, including if the offence was committed on the basis of the victim's gender identity. Sexual orientation is also mentioned.

Adoption and parenting
The 2015 same-sex marriage legislation includes a provision stating that same-sex couples may be parents to a child. The Adoption of Infants Ordinance states that married couples, unmarried couples and single people may jointly apply to adopt children.

According to a 2006 UK government report, there have been 9 adoptions in the Pitcairn Islands since 1954, the latest being in 1979.

Military service
LGBT individuals may legally serve in the British Armed Forces, as defence is the responsibility of the United Kingdom.

Summary table

See also
 LGBT rights in Oceania
 LGBT rights in the United Kingdom

References

LGBT rights in the Pitcairn Islands
Pitcairn Islands law